Frank Rogers or Frank Rodgers may refer to:
Frank Rogers (politician) (1932–1980), New Zealand politician
Frank Rogers (record producer), American record producer
Frank Rogers (Brookside), fictional character in TV soap Brookside
Frank Bradway Rogers (1914–1987), American physician and librarian
Frank J. Rogers, member of the California legislature
Frank O. Rogers (1876–1939), college football player and physician
Frank Rodgers (author) (born 1944), author of The Intergalactic Kitchen
Frank E. Rodgers (1909–2000), mayor of Harrison, New Jersey

See also
Francis Rogers (disambiguation)